Saint Gottschalk (or Godescalc) (died 7 June 1066) was a prince of the Obotrite confederacy from 1043 to 1066. He established a Slavic kingdom on the Elbe (in the area of present-day northeastern Germany) in the mid-11th century. His object in life seems to have been to collect the scattered tribes of the Slavs into one kingdom, and to make that kingdom Christian.

"A pious and god-fearing man", Gottschalk effected the Christianisation of the Slavic tribes of the Elbe. He organised missions of German priests and founded monasteries at Oldenburg, Mecklenburg, Ratzeburg, Lübeck, and Lenzen, erecting the first three into dioceses. He himself often accompanied the missionaries on their work and augmented their message with his own explanations and instructions. In all this, he was supported by the efforts of Adalbert, Archbishop of Hamburg. However, the Obotrite nobility and peasantry largely remained pagan.

Life
Gottschalk's father Udo was a bad Christian (male christianus according to Adam of Bremen) whose own father, Mistiwoi, had renounced the new religion for the old Slavic paganism. Udo sent his son to be educated at the monastery of St Michael at Lenzen and later at Lüneburg. After a Saxon murdered Udo in 1028, Gottschalk renounced Christianity and took over the leadership of the Liutizi to avenge his father. He killed many Saxons before Duke Bernard II of Saxony defeated and captured him; his lands went to Ratibor of the Polabians. 

Re-converted to Christianity, Gottschalk was released and sent to Denmark with many of his people to serve King Canute the Great in his wars with Norway. He was sent to England with Canute's son Sweyn. 

Sven Estridson, Jarl of Denmark, desired independence from King Magnus I of Norway in 1042. Because Magnus was supported by his brother-in-law, Bernard II, Sven achieved an alliance with the Obotrites through the mediation of Gottschalk. However, the Obotrite chief Ratibor was killed in a siege by Magnus in 1043. The death of Ratibor and his sons allowed Gottschalk, who married Sven's daughter Sigrid, to seek the inheritance of his father Udo as Prince of the Obodrites. During the so-called Liutizi Civil War (Lutizischer Bruderkrieg) of 1057, Gottschalk conquered the Circipani and Kessini. He secured the territory through the building of new fortresses; the old fortifications of the conquered tribes were removed. He subdued the Liutizi and the diocese of Bremen "feared him as king" and paid him tribute. He nurtured alliance with his Christian neighbours, Scandinavian and German and joined in an alliance with Duke Bernard and King Magnus to defeat the Liutizi in battle.

Allied with the Lutici, the Obotrites murdered Gottschalk in a 1066 rebellion, capturing the castle of Lenzen and forcing his sons Henry and Budivoj to flee to Denmark and to Lüneburg respectively. Initially the Lutici-Obotrie alliance was led by Blus, but after his death in 1066, Kruto, whose power-base was Wagria, replaced him. Budivoj campaigned against Kruto with Saxon assistance, but was killed at Plön in 1075. Henry succeeded in avenging his father's death by killing Kruto at a feast in 1090.

Gottschalk's feast is the day of his death, according to the Carthusians of Brussels in the Martyrology of Usuardus. The primary sources for his life are Adam of Bremen and Helmold. "Had he lived, he would have brought all pagans to the Christian faith." His son Henry later championed the missionary work of Vicelinus.

Butler's account

The hagiographer Alban Butler (1710–1773) wrote in his Lives of the Fathers, Martyrs, and Other Principal Saints under June 7,

Notes

Sources

 

1066 deaths
German Roman Catholic saints
Obotrite princes
11th-century Christian saints
Year of birth unknown